The Terror Dream: Fear and Fantasy in Post-9/11 America is a 2007 book by Susan Faludi, in which the author argues that the terrorist acts of September 11, 2001 resulted in an attack on feminism. In 2007, the book was a finalist for the National Book Critics Circle Award for Criticism.

Context
"On September 11, 2001, 19 militants associated with the Islamic extremist group al-Qaeda hijacked four airliners and carried out suicide attacks against targets in the United States. Two of the planes were flown into the towers of the World Trade Center in New York City, a third plane hit the Pentagon just outside Washington, D.C., and the fourth plane crashed in a field in Pennsylvania. The total number of people killed because of these attacks was 2,753. The ratio of men to women killed during the attacks was 3:1. Faludi talks in depth about how mass amounts of volunteers arrived to help the victims rescued for the World Trade Center Towers. However, there were very few victims to help. 21,744 remains were found while only 291 bodies were found "intact".

Synopsis
Faludi focuses on analyzing the media, politics, and popular culture to find the answer to why American society tried to restore "traditional" manhood and gender roles after the 9/11 attacks. She uses mainly anecdotal and qualitative evidence to support her theories. During the first half of the book, Faludi explains how America reacted after the events of 9/11. Faludi argues that the media was guilty of creating myths about "John Wayne" type of men, particularly New York Firemen, rescuing "damsels in distress" in the aftermath of the attack. Sexist slogans such as "As War Looms, It's OK to Let Boys Be Boys Again", were displayed proudly in the media while women were marginalized by the media. Firefighters were renamed firemen in the media and women were not eligible to receive "hero status". A clear example of how men were the only ones qualified to be heroes can be seen from the events that occurred on Flight 93. The men, such as Todd Beamer, on the plane were hailed as heroes despite no clear evidence of these facts while Sandra Bradshaw, a flight attendant who tried to throw boiling water on the terrorists, was barely mentioned in the media. Feminism talk was denounced as unpatriotic. Government stoked the anti-feminist fire with propaganda about the American military men protecting the American women and going to save the women of Afghanistan from oppression. There was also a significant decrease in the number of sexual discrimination cases prosecuted in federal courts.

In the next part of the book, Faludi traces the history of how American culture has always loved myths created of rescuing "damsels in distress". Faludi talks about Jessica Lynch's story of being a prisoner of war. Lynch was originally portrayed in the media as a tough girl, but the media soon cast her as a "damsel in distress" who needed saving. Throughout history, a demand for the manly man was needed to convey the image that America could defend itself from any foreign entities. Faludi argues that the 9/11 attacks caused Americans to return to these myths that have been ingrained into our psyche and try to restore traditional gender roles out of fear.

Faludi concludes that we need to become an equal society that embraces diversity and individual talents instead of retreating to these false ideologies that do more harm than good to our society.

Reception

The Terror Dream was met with mixed reviews by critics. In a review published in USA Today, Olivia Barker stated the book was "probing and provocative". However, Barker criticized Faludi for using secondhand sources and not interviewing sources herself. In addition, Barker criticized Faludi for not giving the media individuals she attacked in her book a chance to explain themselves. Author Carol Anne Douglas stated, "Faludi's book certainly makes a point, but it lacked an economic analysis". A professor at the University of East Anglia, Sarah Churchwell, applauded Faludi's argument. However, Churchwell criticized that Faludi exaggerated and created myths of her own. In the review, Churchwell said, "Ultimately Faludi is guilty of her own exaggerations and mythmaking, strong-arming her argument into submission - which is a pity, because it was so unnecessary."

New York Times journalist, Michiko Kakutani, was highly critical of The Terror Dream. "This, sadly, is the sort of tendentious, self important, sloppily reasoned book that gives feminism a bad name."  She accused Faludi of using the 9/11 attacks as a platform to restate many of the arguments she made in Backlash. In addition, Kakutani accused Faludi of ignoring evidence that would discredit her theories while providing anecdotal evidence to support them. Kakutani stated, "...ill conceived and poorly executed book-a book that stands as one of the more nonsensical volumes yet published about the aftermath of 9/11." Another NY Times journalist, John Leonard, had a much more positive view of Faludi's The Terror Dream. Leonard stated, "In The Terror Dream a skeptical Faludi reads everything, second-guesses everybody, watches too much talking-head TV and emerges from the archives and the pulp id like an exorcist and a Penthesilea."

In 2007, the book was a finalist for the National Book Critics Circle Award for Criticism.

References

External links
After Words interview with Faludi on The Terror Dream, January 5, 2008, C-SPAN

2007 non-fiction books
American non-fiction books
Books about politics of the United States
Books by Susan Faludi
English-language books
Feminist books
Macmillan Publishers books